Hakea drupacea, commonly known as sweet scented hakea, is a tree or shrub which is native to south west Western Australia.

Description
Smaller branches are hairy. The leaf may divide into 2-8 segments. The inflorescence are short racemes of sweetly scented white or cream flowers tipped with pink or brownish pollen. The flowers are abundant and appear in the outer leaf axils from March to June.

Taxonomy and naming
Hakea drupacea was first formally described by Karl Friedrich von Gaertner in 1807 and given the name Conchium drupaceum. It was also formerly known as Hakea suaveolens.

Distribution and habitat
Sweet-scented hakea occurs mainly as a coastal species, between Albany and east of Cape Arid and on the Recherche Archipelago Islands. The species is naturalised in South Africa (where it is known as soethakea, meaning "sweet hakea"), New Zealand and 
coastal Victoria. Grows in open heath or low shrubland areas with granite hillsides occasionally quartzite areas or coastal limestone cliffs.

Conservation status

Hakea drupacea is classified as "not threatened" by the Western Australian Government Department of Parks Wildlife.

References

drupacea
Eudicots of Western Australia
Plants described in 1807
Taxa named by Karl Friedrich von Gaertner